Alclofenac is a nonsteroidal anti-inflammatory drug (NSAID).

Synthesis

References

Carboxylic acids
Chloroarenes
Phenol ethers
Nonsteroidal anti-inflammatory drugs
Allyl compounds